The county of Solander is a cadastral division of Queensland which contains the towns of Ayton, Daintree, Mossman and Port Douglas.  The county is divided into civil  parishes. 

It was originally the southern part of the county of Banks when the counties were named and bounded in 1901.

Parishes
Solander is subdivided into parishes, listed as follows:

References

External links 
 County map of Solander, 1923

Solander